The 1996–97 Georgia Bulldogs basketball team represented the University of Georgia as a member of the Southeastern Conference during the 1996–97 NCAA men's basketball season. The team was led by head coach Tubby Smith, and played their home games at Stegeman Coliseum in Athens, Georgia. The Bulldogs finished 3rd in the SEC East during the regular season, had a strong showing at the SEC tournament, and received an at-large bid to the NCAA tournament as No. 3 seed in the Southeast region. They were upset by No. 14 seed Chattanooga in the opening round and finished the season at 24–9 (10–6 SEC).

Roster

Schedule and results

|-
!colspan=9 style=| Non-conference Regular season

|-
!colspan=9 style=| SEC Regular season

|-
!colspan=9 style=| SEC Tournament

|-
!colspan=9 style=| NCAA Tournament

Rankings

References

Georgia Bulldogs basketball seasons
Georgia
Georgia
Georgia Bulldogs
Georgia Bulldogs